Mutavi Charles Kilonzo is a Kenyan politician. He belongs to the Orange Democratic Movement-Kenya and was elected to represent the Yatta Constituency in the National Assembly of Kenya since the 2007 Kenyan parliamentary election.

References

1954 births
Living people
Orange Democratic Movement politicians
Members of the National Assembly (Kenya)
Place of birth missing (living people)